Crainquebille is a 1922 French silent film directed by Jacques Feyder. The film was known as Bill in the US and as Old Bill of Paris and Coster Bill of Paris in the UK. The restored film is now known for its cinematic realism compared to many other films of the silent era .

Plot

Jérôme Crainquebille, is an ageing modest vegetable seller who has sold groceries from his cart in Les Halles market in Paris for over 40 years. One day, whilst waiting for a customer to give him his change, he is hassled by a policeman who insists that he moves on.  When he protests, Crainquebille is arrested, supposedly for swearing at the policeman.  Following a farcical trial, the old man is sent to jail, where due to the poor quality of his past life he enjoys the benefits of the free shelter and food.

On his release, however, his life continues to nose-dive: all of his past regular customers shun him, and, with no income, he turns to the bottle becoming an alcoholic. He is reduced to a tramp that everybody loathes, and the sad old man is about to commit suicide when a young street boy called "Mouse" takes him by the hand to forget about the past and persuades him to make a fresh start.

Cast
Maurice de Féraudy as Jérôme Crainquebille 
Félix Oudart as L'agent 64 
Jean Forest as La Souris 
Marguerite Carré as Mme Laure 
Jeanne Cheirel as Mme Bayard 
René Worms as M. Lemerle 
Charles Mosnier  
Armand Numès  
Françoise Rosay

Preservation status
In 2005, a restored 35mm print was produced by Lobster Films in Paris in association with Lenny Borger, and was released on DVD by Home Vision Entertainment in 2006.

References

External links 
 
 Crainquebille at SilentEra

1922 films
1922 drama films
French silent feature films
French drama films
French black-and-white films
Films set in Paris
Films directed by Jacques Feyder
Silent drama films
1920s French films